Take Me Away may refer to:

Songs
"Take Me Away" (Avril Lavigne song), 2004
"Take Me Away" (Babble song), 1994
"Take Me Away" (Cappella song), 1992
"Take Me Away" (Culture Beat song), 1995
"Take Me Away" (DJ S.K.T song), 2015
"Take Me Away" (Fefe Dobson song)
"Take Me Away" (Keyshia Cole song), 2011
"Take Me Away" (Lash song), 2001
"Take Me Away" (Lifehouse song), 2003
"Take Me Away" (StoneBridge song), 2005
"Take Me Away" (Tiff Lacey song), 2011
"Take Me Away" (Tungevaag & Raaban and Victor Crone song), 2019
"Take Me Away" (Twenty 4 Seven song), 1994
"Take Me Away", by 7 Days Away from Punisher: War Zone Original Motion Picture Soundtrack
"Take Me Away", by Bleachers featuring Grimes from Strange Desire
"Take Me Away", by Blue Öyster Cult from The Revölution by Night
"Take Me Away", by Chase & Status
"Take Me Away", by Christina Vidal from the film soundtrack Freaky Friday
"Take Me Away", by Clooney, the theme to Little Women: LA
"Take Me Away", by Daniel Caesar from Freudian
"Take Me Away", by Danny Fernandes from AutomaticLUV
"Take Me Away", by Delirious? from Audio Lessonover?
"Take Me Away", by FireHouse from Prime Time
"Take Me Away", by Haji & Emanuel
"Take Me Away", by Janet Jackson from Unbreakable
"Take Me Away", by Killswitch Engage from Killswitch Engage (2009 album)
"Take Me Away", by Kotipelto from Coldness
"Take Me Away", by Nine Lies from 9 Lies
"Take Me Away", by Oasis, a B-side of the single "Supersonic"
"Take Me Away", by Plain White T's from All That We Needed
"Take Me Away", by Prism from See Forever Eyes
"Take Me Away", by Scatman John from Take Your Time
"Take Me Away", by Seether from Disclaimer II
"Take Me Away", by Snoop Dogg from I Wanna Thank Me
"Take Me Away", by Status Quo from Never Too Late
"Take Me Away (Into the Night)", by 4 Strings

Films
Take Me Away! (1978 film) or Furimukeba Ai, a Japanese film
Take Me Away (film), a 1994 Italian romance-drama film